Abd-al-Aziz al-Mansur was the king of the Taifa of Valencia between 1021 and 1061. He was the son of Abd al-Rahman Sanchuelo. He was two years old at the time of his father's violent death and was taken for safekeeping to Zaragoza, where he grew up. At the age of fifteen, with the help of Zaragoza, a coup installed him as king of Valencia.

He was responsible for the construction of the Arab wall of the city of Valencia, of which some of the sections still stand today. According to the geographer al-Urdi, the wall had seven gates with semi-circular towers.

References

External links 
 Spanish Royal Academy of History biography page of al-'Aziz b. 'Abd al-Rahman

Taifa of Valencia
11th-century rulers in Al-Andalus